David Burke (born 25 May 1934) is an English actor, known for playing Dr. John Watson in the initial series of Granada Television's 1980s The Adventures of Sherlock Holmes, which starred Jeremy Brett in the title role. He also starred as Joseph Stalin in the last two episodes of Reilly, Ace of Spies.

Early life
Burke was born on 25 May 1934 in Liverpool, England, and trained at Royal Academy of Dramatic Art.

Career
In the theatre, Burke originated the part of Niels Bohr in Michael Frayn's Copenhagen.

Burke played Dr. Watson in The Adventures of Sherlock Holmes for the initial series and then left the programme after receiving an invitation to join the Royal Shakespeare Company along with his wife, Anna. They both considered the joint work to be the best idea for their young son, Tom, who was around 3 years old at the time. He was thought by many to portray Dr. Watson with an excellent style. He was replaced by Edward Hardwicke, whom he had recommended as his successor. Burke had earlier experience with Holmes having played the villain in an adaptation of "The Adventure of the Beryl Coronet" for the 1965 BBC series starring Douglas Wilmer and Nigel Stock.

Other notable TV appearances include his turn as Joseph Stalin in the British serial Reilly, Ace of Spies and the John Wyndham science fiction story Random Quest. He also played William Morris in the 1975 series The Love School. Burke frequently portrays Johannes Coenradus Klene in the Dutch commercials for Klene liquorice.  He appeared with his son, Tom Burke, in the 2006 BBC adaptation of the M.R. James ghost story, Number 13.

Personal life
Burke is married to Anna Calder-Marshall. Their son Tom Burke is also an actor. Burke is an Everton supporter.

Filmography

Film

Television

References

Bibliography

External links

1934 births
Male actors from Liverpool
Alumni of RADA
English male stage actors
English male television actors
Living people
20th-century English male actors
21st-century English male actors
English male film actors
Calder Marshall family